Hoseyn Qeshlaqi Gurabazlu (also Romanized as Ḩoseyn Qeshlāqī Gūrābāzlū; also known as Ḩoseyn Qeshlāqī) is a village in Aslan Duz Rural District, Aslan Duz District, Parsabad County, Ardabil Province, Iran. At the 2006 census, its population was 28, in 4 families.

References 

Towns and villages in Parsabad County